This is a list of people who held the portfolio of Finance Minister of Malta.

Cabinets from 1921 to 1958
Joseph Howard, 1921-1924
Ugo Pasquale Mifsud, 1924
Carmelo Mifsud Bonnici, Il-Gross, 1924-1927
Achille Samut, 1927-1930
Carmelo Mifsud Bonnici, Il-Gross, 1932-1933
Arthur F. Colombo, 1947-1950
John Frendo Azzopardi, 1950
Gorg Borg Olivier, 1950-1951
John Frendo Azzopardi, 1951-1955
Dom Mintoff, 1955-1958

Cabinets since 1962
Political parties

Fourteen people have served as Finance Minister of Malta since 1962.

See also
Government of Malta

Sources
Maltese ministries, etc – Rulers.org

Finance

Finance
Politicians